Holocneminae is a subfamily of cellar spiders (family Pholcidae).

It contains the following genera:

Artema Walckenaer, 1837
Aymaria Huber, 2000
Cenemus Saaristo, 2001
Ceratopholcus Spassky, 1934
Crossopriza Simon, 1893
Holocnemus Simon, 1873
Hoplopholcus Kulczynski, 1908
Ixchela Huber, 2000
Physocyclus Simon, 1893
Priscula Simon, 1893
Smeringopus  Simon, 1890
Stygopholcus Absolon & Kratochvíl, 1932
WugigarraHuber, 2001

See also

List of Pholcidae species

References

Pholcidae
Spider subfamilies